The Omalisinae (formerly family Omalisidae) are a small subfamily of morphologically derived elaterid beetles. The Omalisinae were long considered an independent family in the deprecated family Cantharoidea (more closely related to soft-bodied beetles like fireflies, than click beetles), and later a family in the Elateroidea, but molecular phylogenies have demonstrated the morphological similarity of Omalisinae to other soft bodied beetles is a case of parallel evolution (homoplasy) of their soft bodies, rather than an apomorphy. Members of this beetle subfamily have been reported to have bioluminescent organs on the larvae, although no recent publications have confirmed this. Some recent evidence indicated they were the sister group to a clade comprising the families Rhagophthalmidae and Phengodidae (glowworm beetles), however a more comprehensive phylogenetic analysis based on genome sequences strongly supported the Omalisinae as being contained within the Elateridae.

Species

 Genus Omalisus Geoffroy, 1762
 Omalisus flavangulus (Spåth, 1898)
 Omalisus fontisbellaquaei Geoffroy in Fourcroy, 1785
 Omalisus graecus (Pic, 1901)
 Omalisus minutus (Pic, 1938)
 Omalisus nicaeensis (Lesne, 1921)
 Omalisus nigricornis (Reitter, 1881)
 Omalisus sanguinipennis (Laporte de Castelnau, 1840)
 Omalisus taurinensis (Baudi, 1871)
 Omalisus unicolor (Costa, 1857)
 Omalisus victoris (Mulsant, 1852)
 Genus Thilmanus Baudi, 1872
 Thilmanus longipennis Pic, 1912
 Thilmanus obscurus Baudi, 1872

References
Citations

Bibliography
Omalisidae Species List at Joel Hallan's Biology Catalog. Texas A&M University. Retrieved on 15 Jul 2011.

Elateridae
Polyphaga subfamilies